= Milk production =

Milk production may refer to:

- Dairy, the processing of animal milk for consumption
- Lactation, the biological process of mammalian milk secretion
